The 1955 Wightman Cup was the 27th edition of the annual women's team tennis competition between the United States and Great Britain. It was held at the Westchester Country Club in Rye, New York in the United States.

References

Wightman Cups by year
Wightman Cup, 1955
Wightman Cup
Wightman Cup
Wightman Cup
Wightman Cup